Points in basketball are used to keep track of the score in a game. Points can be accumulated by making field goals (two or three points) or free throws (one point).  If a player makes a field goal from within the three-point line, the player scores two points.  If the player makes a field goal from beyond the three-point line, the player scores three points.  The team that has recorded the most points at the end of a game is declared that game's winner.

NBA

Regular season
 Most career points: LeBron James (38,390 pts)
 Highest career scoring average: Michael Jordan (30.12 ppg)
 Most points scored in a season: 4,029 by Wilt Chamberlain (1961–62)
 Highest seasonal scoring average: 50.4 by Wilt Chamberlain (1961–62)
 Most points in one game: 100 by Wilt Chamberlain (3/2/1962 vs. New York Knicks)
 Most points in one half, regular season: 59 by Wilt Chamberlain
 Most points in one quarter, regular season: 37 by Klay Thompson
 Most points in one overtime period, regular season: 16 by Gilbert Arenas

Playoffs
 Most career points: LeBron James (7,491)
 Highest career scoring average: Michael Jordan (33.4)
 Most points in one game: Michael Jordan (63, 4/20/1986 vs. Boston Celtics [2OT])
 Most points in one half: Sleepy Floyd (39, Golden State Warriors vs. L.A. Lakers)
 Most points in one quarter: Sleepy Floyd (29, Golden State Warriors vs. L.A. Lakers)
 Most points in one overtime period: Stephen Curry (17, 5/9/16 vs. Portland Trail Blazers)
 Most career points, Finals: Jerry West (1,679)
 Most points in one game, Finals: Elgin Baylor (61, 4/14/1962 vs. Boston Celtics)
 Most points in one half, Finals: Michael Jordan (35, 6/3/1992 vs. Portland Trail Blazers)

U.S. college 
 Most points in one game: 138 points by Grinnell's  Jack Taylor  on  November 20, 2012 
Highest career scoring average: Pete Maravich  (44.2ppg)

See also 
 List of National Basketball Association career scoring leaders
 List of National Basketball Association season scoring leaders
 List of National Basketball Association players with most points in a game
 List of National Basketball Association players with 50 or more points in a playoff game
 List of National Basketball Association top individual scoring season averages
 List of National Basketball Association top rookie scoring averages
 List of National Basketball Association career rebounding leaders
 List of National Basketball Association career assists leaders

References 

Basketball terminology
Basketball statistics
Scoring (basketball)